Francois Petrus 'Toon' van den Heever (1894-1956) was a Hertzog Prize-winning South African poet, a scholar of Roman-Dutch law, and from 1948 to 1956 a judge of the Appellate Division.

Early life and education
Van den Heever was born near Heidelberg and obtained his BA degree at the Transvaal University College in 1916. After university he taught Latin, Dutch and English for two years, after which he joined the Windhoek civil administration and also studied part-time for his LLB degree.

Career
Van den Heever started practicing as an advocate at the Bar in Windhoek in 1921. He then worked as Senior Law Adviser to the Union Government, the Department of Foreign Affairs and from 1931 as Secretary for Justice, Law Adviser for External Affairs and Government Attorney. In 1933 van den Heever was appointed a judge on the South West Africa Division of the Supreme Court of South Africa and in 1938, he relocated to the Orange Free State Provincial Division. In 1948, he became Judge President of the Orange Free State Division and in the same year he was appointed to the Appellate Division, a post he had held until his death in 1956.

Published works
Van den Heever published his debut collection of poems in 1919 and his second bundle only thirty years later. He received the Hertzog Prize for poetry in 1951 for his 1919 debut bundel, Gedigte, that was reworked in 1931 as Eugene en ander gedigte. Besides poetry, he also published sketches, narratives and short stories.

His published works include: 
Gedigte (1919 – Poetry)
Die speelman van Dorestad (1949 – Poetry)
Gerwe uit die erfpag van Skoppensboer (1949 – Short stories)

References 

1894 births
1956 deaths
20th-century South African judges
South African jurists
South African judges
South African male poets
Hertzog Prize winners for poetry